Coventry RLFC was a semi-professional rugby league team based in Coventry, West Midlands, England that played in the Northern Rugby Football Union League in the 1910–11, 1911–12, and 1912–13 seasons.

History 

The club was formed in 1910 by players converting to Northern Union from rugby union.  The club was admitted to the Northern Union in December 1910 in time for the start of the 1910–11 season. The new league club took over the tenancy of the Butts previously the home of Coventry rugby union club. Results on the field were poor and as a consequence, so were attendances. Receipts were not sufficient to sustain the club and Coventry RLFC folded after completion of the 1912–13 season.

Today 

Rugby League returned to Coventry in the 21st century when Coventry Bears was formed, playing in the third tier League 1, and from 2004 to 2021 also played at the Butts, now called Butts Park Arena. In 2022 the Bears, now renamed Midlands Hurricanes moved out of the city.

Club league record 
For the 1910–11 to 1912–13 seasons, Coventry RLFC achieved the following record:

Heading Abbreviations
RL = Single division; Pl = Games played; W = Win; D = Draw; L = Lose; PF = Points for; PA = Points against; Diff = Points difference (+ or -); Pts = League points
% Pts = A percentage system was used to determine league positions due to clubs playing varying number of fixtures and against different opponents 
League points: for win = 2; for draw = 1; for loss = 0.

Notable players 
John "Jack" Tomes (born 1885 in Rugby, and died 1960 in Coventry) won a cap with England in 1910, when he joined the English side against Wales for a friendly at Coventry.

See also 
List of defunct rugby league clubs

References

External links 
 

Defunct rugby league teams in England
Sport in Coventry
Rugby clubs established in 1910
Rugby league teams in the West Midlands (county)